Erie, Indiana may refer to:
Erie, Lawrence County, Indiana
Erie, Miami County, Indiana
Eerie, Indiana, a television series